(literally "Armored Genesis MOSPEADA") is an anime science fiction series created by Shinji Aramaki and Hideki Kakinuma. The 25-episode television series ran from late 1983 to early 1984 in Japan. MOSPEADA stands for Military Operation Soldier Protection Emergency Aviation Dive Armor, one of the transformable motorcycle-armors the series features. The other primary mecha featured in the show is the three-form transformable fighter called the Armo-Fighter AFC-01 Legioss. MOSPEADA was adapted as the third generation of the American series Robotech, much like Macross and Southern Cross.

Story
In the 21st century, Earth's pollution problems result in the development of a new hydrogen fuel called "HBT" as an alternative to fossil fuels, while mankind colonizes Mars. In 2050, a mysterious alien race called the Inbit invades Earth. Unable to fight off the Inbit, Earth becomes desolate with only a few pockets of human beings scattered throughout the planet. Many of the refugees escape aboard a few remaining shuttles to seek shelter on the Moon. The Inbit set up their main base of operations on Earth, called "Reflex Point", in the Great Lakes area of North America.

However, the Mars colony, dubbed the Mars Base, does not forget about the plight of Earth. Troops are sent in to fight the Inbit from the Moon, only to fail miserably. The Inbit do not attack Mars and show no interest towards the other planets. Surprisingly, the aliens show no hostility towards humans unless they are directly provoked. The Inbit can also sense the presence of HBT and use of the fuel is limited under their supervision, as HBT is a common component in weapons technology. Mars Base becomes a gigantic military factory, producing vast amounts of advanced weaponry and trained troops. In 2080, Mars Base sends in the next wave of troops called the Earth Recapture Force - but it is virtually destroyed despite a technological advantage including the deployment of transformable mecha.

Mars Base deploys the Second Earth Recapture Force three years later but suffers a similar fate as the first fleet. Legioss pilot Stick Bernard turns out to be the only survivor as he crashlands in South America, but his fiancée, Marlene, is killed in the chaos. A holographic recording of Marlene given to Stick just before the operation began gives him the strength to move on and avenge her death. In his quest to reach Reflex Point, he meets the other main characters of the show, forming a group of ragtag freedom fighters in a quest to rid the planet of the Inbit.

As the plot unfolds, the purpose of the Inbit invasion is revealed: to find a suitable place to evolve into more complex beings. However, the Inbit do not know that their endeavor actually threatens to cause the extinction of both humans and Inbit and thus, it is up to Stick and his group, with the help of humanoid Inbit (Aisha and Solzie), to convince the supreme ruler of the Inbit, the Refless, to flee from Earth.

Characters
The Robotech-adapted names are in brackets: [ ].

 [Scott Bernard] (Bin Shimada): A 20-year-old Mars Base lieutenant who becomes stranded on Earth as the Inbit obliterate the defenses of the Second Earth Recapture Force. As a result of the overwhelming force of the Inbit, Stick's fiancée, is killed when her ship attempts to land on the planet surface, leaving Stick angry and bitter. Even after he gathers his freedom fighters together, he often allows his hatred and blind fury towards the Inbit to distract him from the responsible decision-making his friends know he is capable of. In the end, however, he finds his peace again as he becomes aware of his growing feelings for Aisha, despite her Inbit background.
 [Rand] (Hisao Ōyama): A 17-year-old scavenger who plays the role of the historian, optimist, and wisecracker of the group. Originally, Ray was a loner who actually enjoyed teasing the Inbit as they chased him around the territory, but he joins Stick in order to deal a serious blow to the invaders. Extremely resourceful and with a good intuition, Ray is the first in the group who gradually manages to figure out important clues about the Inbit's true nature. He is a huge fan of Yellow Belmont until he learns that the female singer is actually a man. Over the course of the series, he develops deep feelings for Houquet, but she is slow to warm up to his affections.
 [Annie "Mint" La Belle] (Sanae Miyuki (credited as Miyuki Muroi)): A spirited and precocious 13-year-old girl who was abandoned by her parents. She tags along with the group in order to find a husband, but ends up becoming part of the team. Often considered an annoyance to the rest of the group, Mint is nonetheless loved by her fellow freedom fighters, and proves herself valuable to the mission on several occasions. Her trademark attire is the E.T. cap that she wears. It is not known whether the E.T. stands for the science fantasy movie of the same name or something else.
 [Rook Bartley] (Mika Doi): A 16-year-old former motorcycle gang member and girlfriend to gang leader, Romy. She was severely beaten and taken advantage of by a rival gang when they cornered her away from her group. Houquet initially fights for the helpless and refuses an alliance with Stick, but joins the team after realizing that she would be stronger with them than without them. Eventually she comes to respect her companions enough that she offers to sacrifice herself in order to save the others. She eventually falls in love with Ray, but for most of the series is unable to open her heart and express her feelings to him.
 [Jim "Lunk" Austin] (Tomomichi Nishimura): A 32-year-old maintenance mechanic. Jim initially comes off as the "stupid lunk" of the group, but is soon revealed to be quite intelligent. Jim was once a member of the Mars Base forces, but deserted after failing to save a friend from the Inbit. Though he labeled himself a coward and often sees himself as a liability to Stick's team, the team is quick to object to this, noting Jim's courage and dependability during their repeated encounters with Inbit forces.
 [Lance "Lancer" Belmont] (Mine Matsuki)/(Hirotaka Suzuoki): A 22-year-old soldier from the Second Earth Recapture Force. He poses as both a male soldier and as a female singer, in order to hide from the Inbit and certain locals. Yellow has made quite a name for himself as an entertainer, but upon meeting Stick and his friends, Yellow decides to help free Earth from the Inbit. His ability to completely change both his physical appearance and personality adds to the team's ability to infiltrate towns and cities in order to gather supplies or complete missions. His stage name in Robotech was Yellow Dancer.
 [Ariel/Marlene] (Miki Takahashi): A female Inbit changed into humanoid form as part of an experiment to adapt the Inbit to Terran conditions. (In Robotech, she was given the name Marlene by Scott (Stick) and the others, named after his old fiancée, because when they first met her, they were unaware of her real name.) Suffering from amnesia when Stick's group finds her, she gradually develop human feelings and sympathies, and ends up falling in love with Stick.
 [Regess] (Noriko Ohara): Supreme ruler of the Inbit. Her only goal is to terraform the Earth in order for her race to take it over. Considers humans to be genetically and socially worthless.
 [Sera] (Waka Kanda): Another female Inbit transformed into humanoid form. Accidentally encounters Yellow as he is bathing in a waterfall, and the encounter leaves her resolve shaken as she slowly begins to fall in love with him. Eventually, she becomes the first Inbit to independently sympathize with the human cause.
 [Corg] (Hōchū Ōtsuka): The sole male Inbit in the series changed into humanoid form. Unlike Aisha and Solzie, Battlar's experiences with Stick's team leaves him angry and insulted. His repeated defeat in combat by Stick causes Battlar to make his mission of stopping Stick's group a personal vendetta.

The English-subtitled MOSPEADA DVD released by Harmony Gold and ADV Films uses the inaccurate names (such as "Mint Rubble," "Houquet Emrose," and "Jim Auston") derived from fans on Robotech.com and the Robotech Art I book.

Episode list

Music
Opening theme

Composed by Yukihide Takekawa; lyric by Masao Urino; arranged by Joe Hisaishi
Vocals: Andy Koyama
Ending theme

Composed by Yukihide Takekawa; lyric by Masao Urino; arranged by Joe Hisaishi
Vocals: Andy Koyama and Mine Matsuki

The incidental music was composed by Joe Hisaishi, who would later gain renown for incidental music for the movies of Hayao Miyazaki, though it is accidentally credited, because of a misreading of the name characters, to a "Yuzuru Hisaishi." MOSPEADA is the first anime series to have a jazz-based theme song (Blue Rain).

Malaysian indie rock band Hujan made their own cover of the opening song titled Lonely Soldier Boy (derived from one of the lyrics' English lines) where the lyrics are entirely translated from Japanese into Malay, except for the English lines which are left intact. The song was included in the band's album, also named after the song.

Production

The original working titles for MOSPEADA were: Kouka Kihei Vector ("Descent Machine Soldier Vector"), Chou Fumetsu Yousai Reflex Point ("Super Immortal Fortress Reflex Point") and AD Patrol: the story of city police where the main character rides a transformable bike that changes into his partner. The main character designs were created by Yoshitaka Amano, who would later gain renown for his character artwork for the Final Fantasy series.

Each of the Japanese episode titles contains a musical reference. This style of titling would later be used by Cowboy Bebop.

Mechanical designer Shinji Aramaki came up with the transformable motorcycle-powered exoskeleton design while working on the Diaclone series (which later became part of Transformers). When riding his Honda VT250 250 cc motorbike he thought to himself that it was the right size for a person to wear. Aramaki mentioned that the idea came to him because of his love for riding motorcycles when he was young.

The bike design was inspired by the Suzuki Katana. The black and white stripes on the Legioss and VR ride armor are a tribute to the Allied invasion stripes in World War II.

The series was released in North America by ADV Films with the original Japanese language and English subtitles on June 17, 2003.

Adaptation for the Robotech series
Most of MOSPEADA'''s animation (with edited content and revised dialogue) was adapted for American audiences as Robotech: The New Generation, the third saga of the Robotech compilation series. In Robotech, the Inbit became the "Invid" of the "Third Generation" (also featured in Robotech II: The Sentinels) and the advanced space forces are the returning Robotech Expeditionary Force (REF) that left before the "Second Generation" of Robotech on Earth. Earth's Defense Forces were decimated in the previous saga. Unlike the Invid in the adapted Robotech, the Inbit in MOSPEADA had nothing to do with the Robotech Masters (their sworn enemies in Robotech) and they were just looking for a good planet on which to evolve and reach perfection. Likewise, the REF forces under Admiral Hunter's command that Barnard frequently referred to were troops from the Mars and Jupiter bases which harassed the Invid, though they were playing a "leave alone" system with humans on Earth.

The show's transformable mecha were also renamed; the Armor Cycles as Veritech Cyclones motorcycles; the AFC-01 Legioss became the VF/A-6 Alpha Veritech; the AB-01 Tlead became the VFB-9 Beta Veritech. Like Macross and The Super Dimension Cavalry Southern Cross, Genesis Climber MOSPEADA was cut and fitted to be part of the Robotech continuum by Harmony Gold and Carl Macek.

Character names were generally altered without major changes in characterization, making MOSPEADA the least altered series of the three. Incidentally, it is also the series that has seen the most usage in the expanded universe of Robotech II: The Sentinels and Robotech: The Shadow Chronicles, especially in terms of character, mecha, and ship designs, as it was chronologically the last series used in Robotech. Unlike Macross, which is owned by Big West, Harmony Gold is free to utilize elements from the Tatsunoko-owned MOSPEADA.

Love Live Alive
After the original run of the television series, an OVA music video titled Genesis Climber MOSPEADA: Love Live Alive was released in Japan in September 1985. The music video consisted of both old and new footage. The story of Love Live Alive chronicled the events after the ending of MOSPEADA, featuring Yellow Belmont as the main character.

The music video focused on Yellow's concert and his flashbacks of past events. In 2013, it was adapted by Harmony Gold into Robotech: Love Live Alive. Some DVD releases of the Robotech version of Love Live Alive also include the original Japanese version as bonus content.

References

Bibliography
 MOSPEADA Complete Art Works''. Shinkigensha, 2009.

External links
 MOSPEADA in Tatsunoko Productions web site
 
 
 
 

1983 anime television series debuts
1985 anime OVAs
ADV Films
Adventure anime and manga
Fuji TV original programming
Japanese science fiction television series
Post-apocalyptic anime and manga
Real robot anime and manga
Robotech
Tatsunoko Production